Inuk is a Greenlandic Inuit given name meaning “human being.” It is used for both males and females but has been a popular name for boys in Greenland in recent years.

People 
 Inuk Silis Høegh, Greenlandic artist and film maker.

Notes  

Masculine given names